Going to Meet the Man, published in 1965, is a collection of eight short stories by American writer James Baldwin. The book, dedicated "for Beauford Delaney", covers many topics related to anti-Black racism in American society, as well as African-American–Jewish relations, childhood, the creative process, criminal justice, drug addiction, family relationships, jazz,  lynching, sexuality, and white supremacy.

The Rockpile 
Whilst Roy and John are forbidden to play on the Rockpile as the other boys from the neighborhood do, Roy decides to go anyway once, asking John not to tell anyone as he will be right back. There he gets into a fight and gets hurt, starts bleeding. He is brought back into the house and as the father gets home, he tries to blame the woman and John for letting Roy go there. He favors Roy because he is his biological son and while John, his stepson, serves as the scapegoat.

Themes of the story include the feelings of alienation and neglect. The story also touches on the topics of reckless boys, familial love, favoritism, dominance, and abuse.

Characters 
The characters are the same as in Baldwin's earlier novel, Go Tell It on the Mountain.

 Elizabeth, the mother.
 Gabriel, the father, who is a preacher.
 Roy, son of Elizabeth and Gabriel who gets hurt on the rockpile.
 John, Elizabeth's illegitimate elder son, born out of wedlock.
 Delilah, daughter of Elizabeth and Gabriel.
 Paul, son of Elizabeth and Gabriel.
 Sister McCandless
 Richard, a boy who drowned in the Bronx River.
 Aunt Florence, Gabriel's sister, who lives in the Bronx.

The Outing 
On the Fourth of July, parishioners are having a church outing, which, this year, happens to be boat trip up the Hudson River up to Bear Mountain.

Johnnie and Roy are brothers going on a religious outing on a boat with their church. Johnnie's father, Gabriel, tells him to be good, and Johnnie replies that he need not reprimand him. Johnnie and Gabriel get in a verbal fight and Johnnie is left visibly angry. Johnnie gets a moment alone with his best friend, David, they embrace and Johnnie tells David he loves him. Everyone on the boat is talking about sin and salvation. There is then a church ceremony on the boat, with an ironic digression on the Bible being based on white symbolism. Later, the boys are waiting for their friend Sylvia to be alone as they have brought her a present. Johnnie leaves David and Roy to be alone for a while. When Johnnie joins David and Roy at the riverside, it is time for them to leave. David is with Sylvia, Roy is with another girl and Johnnie is alone.

Major themes of the story include adolescence and puberty; and religious faith in the African-American community.

Characters 

 Gabriel Grimes, Johnnie's stepfather
 Father James
 Johnnie
 Lois, Johnnie's nine-year-old sister.
 Roy, Gabriel's Son.
 Mrs Jackson, David and Lorraine's mother.
 David Jackson, John and Roy's friend
 Lorraine, David's elder sister.
 Sister McCandless
 Sylvia
 Sister Daniels, Sylvia's mother.
 Brother Elisha
 Reverend Peters
 'Johnnie's unnamed mother

The Man Child 
In a rural setting, young Eric lives on a large farm with his parents, who are friends with Jamie, a farmer who has lost his farm to Eric's father. Eric's parents are celebrating with Jamie his birthday.

It is Jamie's thirty-fourth birthday and he is at Eric's parents' place to celebrate. Eric's father upbraids him for being alone, with no wife or children, only a dog and his mother. Then Eric and his father go for a walk, during which Eric learns that all the land around him is his, thanks to his father's self-discipline and the passing down of land from generation to generation. Jamie, on the other hand, has lost his land, the land of Eric's father has grown even larger because he bought Jamie's. Back at the house, Jamie blows out the candles.

Later, after Eric's mother had a miscarriage Eric goes to wash his hands at the outdoor pump and runs into Jamie. The latter takes him into a barn and strangles him, while his mother in the kitchen. Jamie walks away with his dog.

Themes in the story include father-son relationships; generational transference of property; white masculinity; white fatherhood; frontier mentality; jealousy; and loneliness.

Characters 

 Eric - 8 years old, blonde.
 Father - 32 years old.
 Mother - pregnant
 Sophie - Eric's would-be little sister, buried in the church courtyard
 Jamie - 34-year-old neighbor who goes to The Rafters, a local bar, with Eric's father every night. His wife left him. Eric's father bought his failing farm.

Previous Condition (1948) 
Peter, an actor, is surreptitiously living in a white neighbourhood in New York.

Back from Chicago where he was working, Peter is now in New York City. His friend Jules lets him stay in a room he is renting in a white neighbourhood; despite hiding, Peter is eventually found out by the other neighbours and the landlady. She evicts him, and he goes back to Jules's, who says he will let him stay at his place. Jules and Peter engage in a long philosophical discussion about the nature of Blackness and Jewishness in America. Later, he goes to dinner with his friend Ida, who suggests suing the landlady, but he prefers not to. He then leaves, takes the subway, and goes to a black bar where he buys a drink for two women.

Racism and African-American life are major themes of this story.

Characters 

 Peter, the protagonist. He is a short black man. He was named after his father. He works as an actor in theatre plays.
 Jules Weissman, a Jewish boy who finds the room in New York for the protagonist.
 Ida, a white girl of Irish descent, from Boston. She married a gay ballet dancer for money.
 the landlady
 the white couple on the subway
 the two ladies in the bar in Harlem

Cultural references 

 The title of the work is most likely a reference to the 15th amendment of the U.S. Constitution, stating that the right to vote cannot be denied due to "previous condition" of servitude.
 Some neighbours are playing Beethoven.
 "Hamp's Boogie", Ella Fitzgerald's "Cow-Cow Boogie".
 Peter says he cannot live up to Booker T. Washington.
Fyodr Dostoyevsky “Crime and Punishment”

Sonny's Blues (1957) 

"Sonny's Blues" was originally published in Partisan Review (1957). The story is written from the first-person singular perspective. Major themes of the story include darkness and light; music; ice; pain, passing it on, and growing from it; and absence. Throughout the short story there are several mentions of "the war," although it is not stated which one.

This Morning, This Evening, So Soon (1960) 
"This Morning, This Evening, So Soon" was originally published in The Atlantic Monthly (September 1960). Its title is a reference to the chorus of the traditional folk song "Tell Old Bill", which recounts the lynching of a man who does not heed the narrator's advice to "leave them downtown girls alone."

The Narrator is spending his last night in Paris with his family and his sister, who is visiting. He then thinks back to the time he returned to America after his mother's funeral, and the way the Statue of Liberty made no sense to him, and people were treating him differently there. He goes on to think back to the time when he was shooting Les Fauves Nous Attendent, and how the director had upbraided him for not playing it real. He then told him of the way a black man in America feels ostracised.

Back to his last night in Paris, the protagonist and Vidal go to a jazz joint, where his music is being played and a group of black Americans entice them to join them. They then all move to a pavement cafe, where Pete starts singing, and Boona joins them. As Vidal suggests moving to another club and thus discarding Boona, Ada invites him along. Later, Talley informs The Narrator that he saw Boona steal ten American dollars (in francs) from Ada's handbag. After the unresolved accusation, they all return to their houses. The Narrator picks up Paul from Mme Dumont, looking towards their voyage towards the United States.

Characters 

 The Narrator, the protagonist. He is a jazz singer and actor in a movie (played Chico). He lives in France with his family.
 Paul, son of Chico and Harriet.
 Mme Dumont, the concierge
 Harriet, from Sweden.
 Louisa, Chico's sister from Alabama.
 Uncle Norman, uncle of Chico and Louisa from Alabama.
 Jean Luc Vidal, a film director
 Ada Holmes, the African-American girl who invites Chico and Vidal to join her and her friends in the jazz joint.
 Ruth, one of the African Americans
 Talley, one of the African Americans
 Pete, one of the African Americans
 Boona, a prize fighter originally from Tunis.

Cultural references 

 Mahalia Jackson
 Harriet and Louisa are going to see Les Folies Bergères while Chico is at the jazz joint.
 On his voyage to America after his mother's death, Chico would sing "I'm Coming, Virginia", "Take This Hammer", "Precious Lord", "Swanee River", Billie Holiday's "Strange Fruit", "Great Getting-Up Morning".
 Vidal mentions Fanny Hill.
 Marlon Brando is said to have been to the restaurant they're going to.
 Hemingway and existentialism are mentioned with regards to clubbers.
 The Algerian War and Charles de Gaulle are mentioned through Vidal's film.
 Black Monday refers to the day of the Brown vs Board of Education decision, as it was referred to by John Bell Williams

Come Out the Wilderness 
Ruth is living with Paul, who has taken to coming back home in the wee hours of night, putting forth that they are not married and that he tells her everything. She feels rejuvenated when Mr Davis not only suggests making her his own secretary and increasing her salary, but also takes her out to lunch. However, as he suggests taking her out at night, she feels confused and emotional, and they return to work. Later, since Paul called her earlier to say he would be away at some art gallery with Cosmo, she goes to a bar and thinks back to an ex-boyfriend who had treated her like a slavegirl on a farm. In tears, she walks out of the bar, feeling disoriented.

Racism is a major theme of the story. Moreover, Mr. Davis speaks in African-American vernacular with Ruth, strengthening their mutual sense of identity.

Characters 

 Ruth, a young black woman. She works for a life insurance company.
 Paul, a painter, Ruth's boyfriend. He is white.
 Cosmo, another painter, a friend of Paul's.
 Arthur, Ruth's ex-boyfriend, a clarinet player. She left her family home in the South with him. They lived together for four years.
 Mr Davis, the other black man at Ruth's company.
 Ruth's father
 Ruth's brother. He came upon her as she was about to make love when she was seventeen, and beat up the boy and called her names; they didn't talk after that.

Cultural references 

 Ruth acknowledges that Paul does not look like a Michelangelo statue.
 One of Ruth's co-workers has a crush on Frank Sinatra.
 Mr Davis hums "Rocks in My Bed".
 African-American slavery

Going to Meet the Man

References

External links
 
 
 Publisher's description of Going to Meet the Man at Amazon.com

1965 short story collections
Short story collections by James Baldwin
African-American short story collections
LGBT short story collections